Ramonia vermispora is a species of saxicolous (rock-dwelling) and crustose lichen in the family Gyalectaceae. Found in the Sonoran Desert region of the southwestern United States, it was formally described as a new species in 2008 by lichenologists James Lendemer and Karry Knudsen. The lichen is only known to occur at the type locality, which is part of the San Jacinto Mountains. The specific epithet vermispora alludes to the "worm-like appearance of the ascospores". Similar species include R. ablephora and R. gyalectiformis, both of which can be distinguished from R. vermispora by ascospore morphology.

References

Gyalectales
Lichen species
Lichens described in 2008
Lichens of the Southwestern United States
Fungi without expected TNC conservation status